9 is a Canadian comedy-drama film, which was released in 2016. Adapted from Stéphane E. Roy's theatrical play 9 Variations on the Void (Neuf variations sur le vide), the film is an anthology of nine short films by nine different film directors on the theme of communication difficulties, unified by the common narrative element of a conference on communication by self-help guru Marc Gélinas (played by Roy). Segments were directed by Roy, Claude Brie, Érik Canuel, Jean-Philippe Duval, Marc Labrèche, Micheline Lanctôt, Luc Picard, Éric Tessier and Ricardo Trogi.

Segments
"Abus" (Roy) - Annabelle (Anne-Marie Cadieux) and Christian (Christian Bégin) are a married couple who play manipulative games with each other.
"Subitement" (Picard) – An actor receives a call informing him of his partner's sudden death, becoming trapped in a circle of hollow communication as the people around him don't know how to meaningfully express themselves around death. With Alexis Martin, Sophie Cadieux, Charlotte Aubin.
"Fuite" (Trogi) – A couple (Hélène Bourgeois Leclerc and Pierre-François Legendre) run into conflict while travelling in Brussels.
"Hystérie" (Duval) – A director (François Papineau) and an actress (Bénédicte Décary) working together on a television commercial are interested in each other, but play tricks on each other as they struggle to communicate their real feelings.
"Je me souviens" (Lanctôt) – At a reunion, two old friends (Anne-Élisabeth Bossé, Magalie Lépine-Blondeau) are unexpectedly confronted with the revelation that one has no recollection at all of the shared experience that defined their friendship for the other.
"Halte Routière" (Canuel) – Two truck drivers (Nicolas Canuel, Maxim Gaudette) meet at a truck stop and engage in a game of sexual attraction and rejection.
"Banqueroute" (Brie) – A man returning from a trip goes to the bank to withdraw money, only to be told that his account is empty. With Sylvain Marcel, Marianne Farley, Diane Lavallée and Goûchy Boy.
"Le lecteur" (Labrèche) – A man's attempt to buy a DVD player evolves into an existential discussion with the salesman. Starring Labrèche and Marc Fournier.
"Eccéité" (Tessier) – Marc Gélinas must confront the accuracy of his own teachings when he reunites with an ex-girlfriend (Noémie Godin-Vigneau).

References

External links

2016 films
2016 comedy-drama films
2016 LGBT-related films
Canadian comedy-drama films
Canadian anthology films
Canadian LGBT-related films
Films directed by Érik Canuel
Films directed by Micheline Lanctôt
Films directed by Luc Picard
Films directed by Ricardo Trogi
Films shot in Montreal
Films set in Montreal
LGBT-related comedy-drama films
Films directed by Éric Tessier
Films directed by Jean-Philippe Duval
2010s French-language films
French-language Canadian films
2010s Canadian films